The 3rd Iowa Light Artillery Battery was a light artillery battery from Iowa that served in the Union Army between September 24, 1861, and October 23, 1865, during the American Civil War.

Service 
The 3rd Iowa Light Artillery was mustered into Federal service at Dubuque, Iowa for a three-year enlistment on September 24, 1861. The regiment was mustered out of Federal service on October 23, 1865.

Total strength and casualties 
A total of  290 men served in the 3rd Iowa Battery at one time or another during its existence. It suffered 3 enlisted men who were killed in action or who died of their wounds and 34 enlisted men who died of disease, for a total of 37 fatalities#

References

Bibliography 
The Civil War Archive

Units and formations of the Union Army from Iowa
1861 establishments in Iowa
Military units and formations established in 1861
Artillery units and formations of the American Civil War
Military units and formations disestablished in 1865